The 2008 Coca-Cola 600, the 49th running of the event, was a NASCAR stock car race held on May 25, 2008, at Lowe's Motor Speedway in Concord, North Carolina. The race was the twelfth stock car race of the 2008 NASCAR Sprint Cup season. The 400-lap race was won by Kasey Kahne of the Gillett Evernham Motorsports team, who started from the 2nd position. Greg Biffle finished second and Kyle Busch came in third.

Background

The Coca-Cola 600 was the twelfth scheduled stock car race of the 2008 NASCAR Sprint Cup Series, out of 36, and the 49th iteration of the event. It was held on May 25, 2008, at Lowe's Motor Speedway in Concord, North Carolina. Lowe's Motor Speedway is a motorsports complex located thirteen miles from Charlotte, North Carolina in Concord, North Carolina. The complex features a 1.5 miles (2.4 km) quad-oval track that hosts NASCAR racing including the prestigious Coca-Cola 600 on Memorial Day weekend, the Nextel All-Star Challenge, and the Bank of America 500. The speedway was built in 1959 by Bruton Smith and is considered the home track for NASCAR. The track is owned and operated by Speedway Motorsports Inc. (SMI). Following the 2008 Coca-Cola 600, Humpy Wheeler retired as track president.

Entry list

Qualifying
There were a total of three practice sessions prior to the race. During the first session on Thursday, May 22, 2008, David Ragan had the fastest speed at 181.622 mph. 
Before Saturday's first practice session, both Haas CNC Racing cars - the No. 66 of Scott Riggs and the No. 70 Johnny Sauter - were impounded by NASCAR officials and taken to the research and development center for illegal wing adjustments. As a result, they were forced to drive backup cars and start at the rear of the starting lineup. Both teams were also charged a US $100,000 fine in addition to having their crew chiefs suspended for the next six races starting at Dover and running through Daytona. 
 
The second practice session took place on Saturday, May 24, 2008, with Greg Biffle taking the top position with a speed of 180.282 mph. Brian Vickers had the fastest practice speed at 180.735 mph during the third and final practice session on Saturday. 
Kyle Busch won the Coors Light Pole, currently known as the Busch Pole Award, with a speed of 185.433 mph for his second pole of 2008 and the fourth of his career. He began on P-1 with Sprint All-Star Race XXIV champion Kasey Kahne next to him filling out the front row.
Failed to Qualify: Jeff Green (No. 34), Stanton Barrett (No. 50), Jon Wood (No. 21), Joe Nemechek (No. 78) and Tony Raines (No. 08).

Race recap
The 2008 Coca-Cola 600 began with a scheduled green flag at 5:45 p.m. EST. The race award was set at approximately $6,648,557. The Car of Tomorrow had a successful race following its initial introduction at the 2007 Food City 500, and a record number of green flag passes was set with the average green flag run lasting 29.2 laps. Kyle Busch led for the first 33 laps and lost his lead to Brian Vickers until a cut tire sent Vickers into the turn 4 wall while leading the field by an entire backstretch. Kasey Kahne, Jimmie Johnson, Tony Stewart, and Busch then traded the lead amongst themselves several times after Vickers fell out of contention. Kurt Busch held the longest lead of the race from laps 67 to 119 which totaled to 53 laps led in one consecutive run. Dale Earnhardt Jr. maintained the most laps led throughout at 76 laps. There was a total of 39 lead changes during the race with 16 different drivers leading a lap. Johnson, who was leading late in the race, fell out of the race after experiencing engine failure that caused him to finish 39th. Robby Gordon and Patrick Carpentier also had engine trouble, and Paul Menard was eliminated from the running due to his car overheating. Approximately 12.5% of the race was run under caution, including five turning related accidents and three cautions citing debris.

After pit stops cycled through with 10 laps to go, Tony Stewart led the 2nd place car of Kasey Kahne by a large margin. Stewart cut a tire while leading with 2 laps to go, putting the victory in the lap of Kahne. With his eighth career win, Kahne completed the Charlotte sweep by following up his 2008 Sprint All-Star Race win with a win in the 600. Kahne's margin of victory was 10.203 seconds. This was his first win in 2008—ending his 52 race winless drought. Greg Biffle finished 2nd, Busch finished 3rd, while Jeff Gordon and Earnhardt Jr. rounded out the Top 5. The total race time was 4:25:09.

Live television coverage of the 2008 Coca-Cola 600 began at 6:30 p.m. EDT in the United States on Fox. Radio coverage was handled by Sirius Satellite Radio and the Speedway Motorsports, Inc.-owned Performance Racing Network on terrestrial radio stations.

Race results

Post-race standings

References

Coca-Cola 600
Coca-Cola 600
NASCAR races at Charlotte Motor Speedway